William Pettus Hobby (March 26, 1878 – June 7, 1964) was known as the publisher/owner of the Beaumont Enterprise when he entered politics and the Democratic Party. Elected in 1914 as Lieutenant Governor of Texas, in 1917 he succeeded to become 27th Governor of the U.S. state of Texas, after James Edward "Pa" Ferguson was impeached and forced to resign. In 1918, Hobby won the office in his own right, serving a full term.

In 1924, Hobby lost the Democratic primary to Miriam A. Ferguson, wife of "Pa" Ferguson and she was elected to the governorship. Hobby returned to publishing, and in 1924 was chosen as president of the Houston Post.  He later served as chairman of the board of the Houston Post Company, which had also acquired radio and TV stations.

Early life
Born in 1878 in Moscow, Texas, Hobby attended local public schools.

He started working at the age of 17 as a circulation clerk for the Houston Post in 1895. Several years later, he was promoted to business writer in August 1901. In 1907, he left the Post to become manager and part owner of the Beaumont Enterprise. He acquired the entire paper shortly thereafter.

Political career
Hobby decided to enter politics and joined the Democratic Party.  In 1914, he ran for and was elected Lieutenant Governor of Texas. After Governor James Edward Ferguson, known as "Pa" Ferguson, was impeached and forced to resign from office in a corruption case in 1917, Hobby succeeded him at 39 and was then the youngest governor in state history. Ferguson prohibited from serving in state electoral office again.

Hobby soundly defeated Ferguson in the 1918 Democratic primary and won the general election, governorship in his own right, and served a full term to 1921. During his years of service, the southern border of Texas was a place of frequent conflict, as revolutionaries from the Mexican Revolution (1910–1920) entered the United States to attack farms, irrigation systems, and railroads. The Texas Rangers, militias, and US troops patrolled the border, and atrocities were committed by both sides.

In early 1919, a Joint Committee of the Texas Senate and House conducted hearings to investigate actions by the Texas Rangers along the border. They conducted hearings for two weeks and had 83 witnesses. Among the incidents recounted was the Porvenir Massacre of January 1918 in West Texas in which militia and Texas Rangers summarily killed 15 Mexican-American men and boys near their farming village. The legislature passed a bill to regulate the Rangers and to professionalize the service, and their numbers were reduced. Historians estimate that the Rangers killed up to 5,000 people, mostly ethnic Mexicans, from 1914 to 1919.

Publisher
After leaving the governorship, Hobby returned to the Beaumont Enterprise. In 1924, he was invited to become the president of the Houston Post. In August 1955, Hobby became chairman of the board of the Houston Post Company. By then, the company also owned the radio station, KPRC, and the television station, KPRC-TV. His wife, Oveta Culp Hobby (see below), served as president and editor.

Personal and civic life
In 1931, Hobby married Oveta Culp. She later was appointed as the first Secretary of the US Department of Health, Education and Welfare (its name was changed after a later reorganization).

Hobby served as a member on the Board of Directors of Texas Technological College.

Family
His son William P. Hobby Jr. also served as lieutenant governor of Texas from 1973 to 1991. His daughter, Jessica, was married to Henry E. Catto Jr., who became the Ambassador of the United States to the Court of St James's. His grandson, Paul Hobby, narrowly lost the election for comptroller of Texas in the 1998 general election. Republican Carole Keeton Strayhorn won that election.

Legacy

Several public facilities were named for him:

 William P. Hobby Airport in Houston, Texas
 Hobby Elementary School in Houston, Texas
 Hobby Middle School in San Antonio, Texas
 Hobby Center For The Performing Arts in Houston, TX

See also

References

Further reading
James Anthony Clark and Weldon Hart, The Tactful Texan: A Biography of Governor Will Hobby (New York: Random House, 1958). 
Lewis L. Gould, Progressives and Prohibitionists: Texas Democrats in the Wilson Era (Austin: University of Texas Press, 1973; rpt., Austin: Texas State Historical Association, 1992).

External links
 
 Initial messages of Governor W. P. Hobby to the thirty-sixth legislature, state of Texas: Jan. 14, 1919 and Jan. 22, 1919, hosted by the Portal to Texas History

1878 births
1964 deaths
Burials at Glenwood Cemetery (Houston, Texas)
Democratic Party governors of Texas
Lieutenant Governors of Texas
Texas Tech University System regents
People from Houston
Hobby family